The Monterrey Institute of Technology and Higher Education, Santa Fe Campus (in ) commonly shortened as Tecnológico de Monterrey, Campus Santa Fe, ITESM Campus Santa Fe or Tec Santa Fe, is a campus of the Monterrey Institute of Technology and Higher Education private university system in Santa Fe, Mexico City, Mexico. It provides professional studies as well as high school programs. International programs are also available. The campus features modern architecture by the renowned Ricardo Legorreta, having more than 30,000 square meters of construction, with more than 3,000 students.

History

1997-2002
The idea to build the 30th campus was formulated in 1997, but the terrain wasn't acquired until 1999. Construction began on March 19, 2001. On October 22, 2001, the first students started moving from the Mexico City Campus to the Santa Fe Campus, along with new students. By the end of its first year, the Campus Santa Fe had already 1150 students, along with relationships with 35 of Santa Fe's enterprises. There were already many Student Associations and cultural groups.

2003

Along with 2003 came a new head for the Campus, Lic. Salvador Eduardo Garza Boardman, who had worked for the ITESM system for more than 10 years. In March, 2003, the construction for the preparatory building began.
In 2004, the Santa Fe campus won the first place in its group when the quality of technological infrastructure was measured among all campuses.
A treaty was signed with IBM for collaborative research on the areas of Computing, electronics and business.
The ITESM and HP announced the inauguration of the TEC Discovery Center.
The business incubator was founded and in October 2003, the International Entrepreneurs Congress was held with 600 people.

2004
The first Literary Creation and Expression of Movement Contest was held. The Food Bank was created to hold food supplies in order to help the community. During June, the preparatory building was inaugurated. Dr. Julio E. Rubio replaced Salvador Garza as the head of the campus.

2005
The new mission for the ITESM System was given, and the first generation of alumni graduated from the Campus. Lic. Salvador Garza returned once again to replace Dr. Julio E. Rubio . The first and second "Laws of Life" contests were held to give preparatory students a place to express their thoughts, writing essays about how they see the world.

2006
The campus celebrated its fifth anniversary, having 3023 students, of which 1000 were high school students, 1482 undergrads and 372 graduate. The CCA Centro Comunitario de Aprendizaje or Communitary Learning Center, is currently under construction, and will provide the low-income community around the Santa Fe area a place to access computers and learning material.

Campus

Tec de Monterrey Campus Santa Fe (Monterrey Institute of Technology, Santa Fe Campus) is located in the western edge of Mexico City in the area of Santa Fe which is probably the fastest growing business district in Mexico. Campus Santa Fe started operation in August 2001. Today it counts with over 3,600 students enrolled in High School, Undergraduate and Graduate Programs. Santa Fe Campus is located in a 13 hectare land (33 acres) it offers a wide range of sports, cultural and leisure facilities, such as a full size football field, basketball, tennis, and volleyball courts; a 1200 m2 cafeteria, several "snacks", two libraries, laboratories for science and engineering and computer labs. Free Parking and free transportation to and from most of the main areas of the city is offered to all students. Many cultural and athletic activities are offered free of charge to all the regular and international students.

The campus is located in the most important business center in the city, that fact helps students to get employed by huge corporations as Ford, Nokia, Telcel and more. The campus is divided into three buildings for professional studies and a preparatory building with its own hall, green areas, library and snack bar. The professional area has 3 main halls, an auditorium, a library (one of the biggest libraries in Mexico's universities) and a bookstore, along with an information technologies center featuring 70 computers divided by the type of software installed: Business, Programming, Multimedia, Design. There is a Business center and a Gesell dome used for marketing studies. There are nine engineering laboratories:

Energy Transfer Laboratory
Information Technologies Center
Advanced Control and Industrial Networking Laboratory
Manufacture and Productivity Integrating Cell
Mechanics and Metallography Laboratory
Integral Electronics and Potency Systems Laboratory
Telecommunications and Instrumentation Laboratory
Computational Laboratory of Design and Manufacture
Networks and Informatics Security Laboratory

There are two basketball courts, two tennis courts and a full-size (soccer and football) court along with a running track. A gym with various fitness apparatus is also available.
Along with the various snack bars and coffee shops, there is a buffet called "Cafeteria La Fuente" Where students have a place to eat, along with a recreation area.

Student life
Sports

Campus Santa Fe offers a wide range of sports, cultural and leisure facilities, such as a full size football field, basketball, tennis, and volleyball courts.

Culture

The department offers 32 workshops in the following disciplines: Cinematographic appreciation, dancing, ballet, bass, singing, bond, current dancing, Arabic dancing, painting, literature, corporal expression, flamenco, photography, guitar, radio production, locution, and theatre. The campus has the following cultural representative Groups:

 Theatre
 Flamenco
 Musical bond
 Technical and production staff
 They usually hold performances during the academic year.

Student Organizations
Student organizations in campus Santa Fe are widely active and are associated with excellence and relevant events. During the last years, student groups with the University, managed to get conferences by Tony Blair and Howard Shultz, Starbucks CEO.

Student Community
The students’ community is integrated from Mexico's upper class, as it's located in the highest wealth area of Mexico, the economic center and place where most international companies' headquarters are located. Current annual tuition and fees are ranked US$20,000, making the Tec Santa Fe one of the most expensive universities in Mexico and Latin America.

Programs
Undergraduate
Campus Santa offers 25 programs of undergraduate studies in the areas of engineering, business, and social studies.

 B.A. Business Administration
 B.A. Financial Management
 B.A. Business Creation and Development
 B.A. Law with Minor in Finance
 B.A. Law with Minor in Political Science
 B.A. Economics
 B.A. Law
 B.A. Economics and Finances
 B.A. Marketing
 B.A. International Business
 B.A. Economics and Political Science
 B.A. Animation and Digital Art
 B.A. Communication and Digital Media
 B.A. Humanities and Social Sciences
 B.A. Organizational Psychology
 B.A. International Relations
 B.S. Sustainable Development Engineering
 B.S. Industrial Engineering with minor in Systems Engineering
 Digital Music Production Engineering
 B.S. Mechatronics Engineering
 B.S. Industrial Design
 B.S. Electronic and Computer Engineering
 B.S. Telecommunications and Electronic Systems
 B.S. Business Informatics

Post – graduate
Campus Santa Fe offers master's degrees both online and onsite in different areas of study.

 Master in Business Administration
 Master in Finance
 Global MBA
 Executive MBA

Controversies
Access to the campus was blocked when it was under construction by a group of tenants who claimed that they had not been fully compensated for the land by the government.

Sources
5 años, Campus Santa Fe, ITESM, Dirección de Comunicación e Imagen y Relación con Egresados de Campus Santa Fe 2006.

External links

Campus Santa Fe
Universities in Mexico City
Álvaro Obregón, Mexico City
Ricardo Legorreta buildings